Ömer Selahattin Kantar (1878 in İzmir, Ottoman Empire – 17 November 1949 in İzmir, Turkey) was a Turkish archaeologist, museum director, journalist and playwright.

In 1927, he became the founding director of İzmir Archaeology Museum and he held this post until his death. Between 1932-1941, he was responsible for the first organized archaeological excavations at the site of the ancient city of Smyrna, a task he carried out jointly with the German archaeologist Rudolf Naumann. Opening up of a large part of Smyrna's Agora, location of İzmir Agora Open Air Museum today, is due to their work. Naumann and Kantar published the results of their findings for the first time in 1935, with a final version having appeared after Kantar's death in 1950.

See also
 Charles Texier
 Ekrem Akurgal

Bibliography

 

1878 births
1949 deaths
Turkish archaeologists
Turkish journalists
Turkish writers
People from İzmir
20th-century people from the Ottoman Empire